Ferrara Fire Apparatus is an American manufacturer of heavy-duty emergency service equipment.  The firm is based in Holden, Louisiana, and was founded by Chris Ferrara. 
 
Ferrara offers a custom-design process that gives the customer input into how the truck will be built. The manufacturing facility has a floor area of nearly 300,000 square feet and was built by Firmin Construction Corporation.

In 2017, Ferrara Fire Apparatus became a wholly owned subsidiary after being acquired by the REV Group.

Apparatus 

Ferrara Fire Apparatus manufactures a wide variety of fire apparatus including the MVP Rescue Pumper, Custom Pumpers, Aerial Ladders, Aerial Platforms, Industrial Pumpers, Tankers, Rescue, and Wildland trucks.

Ferrara's new Inundator Super Pumper is considered to be the world's largest capacity NFPA-rated fire engine. This truck contains a pump capable of freely moving 5500 GPM from draft.  This figure can rise to 10,000 GPM or more if the pump intake is connected to a pressurized source, such as a municipal water source.

Custom Chassis
Inferno 
Igniter  
Ultra
Cinder

Aerial Ladders
HD-57
HD-77
HD-107
HD-127
HD-100 Mid Mount
SHD-100
FD-100
LP-102

Aerial Platforms
HD-85 Mid Mount Platform 
HD-100 Mid Mount Platform 
HD-85 Rear Mount Platform
HD-100 Rear Mount Platform

References

External links 

 http://www.ferrarafire.com/

Emergency services equipment makers
Manufacturing companies based in Louisiana